First Born is a British science fiction television serial produced by the BBC in 1988. Vasco Sabino played the adolescent hybrid, Gor, in episode 3. Other notable cast members included Charles Dance, Jamie Foster, Julie Peasgood, Gabrielle Anwar, Philip Madoc, Sharon Duce and Roshan Seth.

Premise
Charles Dance starred as genetic researcher Edward Forester, whose work leads him to create a man-gorilla hybrid, using sperm from an unknown sperm donor and cells taken from a female gorilla. He then raises the baby as his own son, only to find that there are horrifying consequences for playing God.

Production
A portion of filming took place in and around the North Wiltshire area, with the Forester family home scenes having been filmed on location in Calne. Woodland scenes from Episode 2 were primarily filmed on location at Savernake Forest near Marlborough, but were subsequently mixed with footage filmed on location in Switzerland. Longleat Safari Park was also used in filming as the setting for the kidnap scenes at the end of Episode 2.

The three-part serial was written by Ted Whitehead and adapted from the novel Gor Saga by Maureen Duffy. It was produced by Sally Head and directed by Philip Saville. The theme tune was composed by Hans Zimmer.

2entertain Ltd released the serial on Region 2 DVD in the UK on 17 July 2006.

See also
Humanzee
Chimera (British TV series)

References

External links

YouTube recording of "First Born" by Hans Zimmer

BBC science fiction television shows
1980s British television miniseries
1980s British science fiction television series
1988 British television series debuts
1988 British television series endings
Television series about genetic engineering
Television shows scored by Hans Zimmer